The Khamba Thoibi Sheireng, also spelled as the Khamba Thoibi Seireng, is a 1940 Meitei language classical epic poem based on the ancient love story of Khuman prince Khamba and Moirang princess Thoibi of Moirang kingdom of Ancient Kangleipak (early Manipur). It is the magnum opus of Hijam Anganghal, the "Bard of Samurou". It is regarded as the national epic of the Manipuris. It is regarded as the greatest of all the epic poems in Meitei literature, with 39,000 verses, even longer than the Ramayana.

The epic saga is one of the major elements of the ancient body of chronicles Epic cycles of incarnations ("Moirang Shayon") as well as "Moirang Kangleirol" (ancient Moirang legends), two of the largest Meitei cultural resources of Manipur.

Textual history 
The epic poem of the Khamba Thoibi Sheireng was developed by Hijam Anganghal Singh from the "pena sheishak" style of the folk ballads sung by minstrels with pena (musical instrument). It was adapted from the Meitei folk ballad known as the "Khamba Thoibi ballad" (better known as the Moirang Sai), which is practised even in present time, for a continuous duration of 20-30 days in diverse musical genres.

The Khamba Thoibi Sheireng is regarded as the masterpiece of Hijam Anganghal. The literary work was started in the year 1939 and it was completed in the year 1940.

Synopsis 

Khuman Khamba was a terrae filius, brought up by his elder sister Khamnu, who spared no pains for his safety and well-being. By the time he became a youth, he wanted to be of some help to his sister and came out in search of work. On the day he first moved out of his house, he happened to enter the residence of prince Chingkhu Akhuba, the younger brother of King Chingkhu Telheiba, with its imposing house and spacious premises and there for the first time saw princess Thoibi, the only daughter of the prince, plying her needle in embroidery. The moment she saw Khamba, handsome and shapely in physique, she gave her heart away to him. But on the part of Khamba, at first he could not harbor such sentiments as he was conscious of his humble origin.

Another man, Nongban, worked as a foil to Khamba. For a long time, there was no one in Moirang to beat him in race, wrestling and hockey, but with the appearance of Khamba, he is defeated and deprived of this honor. At first, the prince took kindly to Khamba, and despite his offer to maintain the young man in his family, the latter insisted on singing for his supper which he did by tending the stall-fed fierce bull of the prince. As everybody was curious of Khamba's physical prowess, his sister then kept him in hiding for a while. Thoibi is heart-brokened and pines after him. From the grace of God Thangching, the two meet again on the Loktak lake. Their love is steady until the recalcitrant behavior and overzealous stance of Thoibi provokes her father to come in the way of the lovers in league with Nongban.

Khamba's gradual rise in popularity amongst the people, winning of the King's favour with the recognition of his identity on account of his superhuman feats in sports and capturing a wild bull singlehanded further enraged the prince. A murder attempt was made on his life and subsequently Thoibi was sent to exile. However, this act could not, in the least, crush the heart of the lover. Thoibi, on her being called back from disgrace, had the opportune moment of joining with her love. Before the actual marriage took place and in a trial of fate, Nongban fell prey to a tiger which Khamba could overcome.

Structure

The epic contains 15 chapters (Pandups) as well as 81 sections (Tangkaks). It consists of approximately thirty four thousand lines.

1st Pandup
In the 1st Pandup, there are two tangkaks.

2nd, 3rd and 4th Pandups
 The 2nd Pandup has only one tangkak named  Kaang Saanaba . 
 The 3rd Pandup has only one tangkak named  Een Chingba . 
 The 4th Pandup has two tangkaks, first one is  Kangjei  but the second one is unnamed.

5th Pandup

6th to 11th Pandups
 The 6th Pandup has four tangkaks, first is  Lamjel , while the remaining are unnamed. 
 The 7th Pandup has fifteen tangkaks, with the first one being  Kau , while the rest being unnamed. 
 The 8th Pandup has two tangkaks, first being  Ukai , but the second is unnamed. 
 The 9th Pandup has three tangkaks, the first is  Heijing , but the rest are unnamed. 
 The 10th Pandup has a single tangkak, named  Torbung Sadanba . 
 The 11th Pandup has only one tangkak,  Samukhong .

12th Pandup

13th Pandup

14th Pandup

15th Pandup
The 15th Pandup has one tangkak,  Khamba Thoibi Luhongba .

Analysis 
While analysing the Khamba Thoibi Seireng, Padma Vibhushan awardee Indian Bengali scholar Suniti Kumar Chatterji commented on Hijam Anganghal, the author and the epic, like this:

Writing on Akashwani All India Radio (AIR), L. Damodar Singh said about the literary work as:

Some scholars compare the Khamba Thoibi Seireng with the Shahnamah, the national epic of Persia and the Kalevale, the national epic of Finland, as well as the Sigurd the Volsung by William Morris.

Translations 

 The direct English version of the epic poem is translated by Dr. Jodhachandra Sanasam in 2017, for which he received the prestigious "Nongthombam Kunjamohan Singh Translation Award 2017", bestowed by the "Sahitya Thoupanglup".

Public response 
In the year 2014, an academic symposium on the topic "Khamba Thoibi Seirengda Mityeng Ama", regarding the epic poetry of Hijam Anganghal, was organised by "Nongchup Haram Khorjei Lup" (NAHAKHOL) at Public Theatre Hall, Nambol Phoijing in Bishnupur district. A book titled "Khamba-Thoibi Seirengda Mityeng" was also published by NAHAKHOL on the occasion.

The "Hijam Anganghal Singh Memorial Lecture 2020-21" was organised at the Artistes’ Dormitory of the Directorate of Arts and Culture in Imphal by the Manipur State Kala Akademi. In the event, scholars discussed about the "Khamba Thoibi Sheireng", as a great contribution of Hijam Anganghal to Meitei literature, that justifiably earned him the title "Mahakavi".

In popular culture 

 "Khamba Thoibi" is a 1997 Meitei language feature film, based on the epic story by Hijam Anganghal, produced by Moirangthem Nilamani Singh for Anjana Films, and directed by M. Nilamani Singh.

See also 
 Numit Kappa
 Akongjamba and Phouoibi
 Henjunaha and Lairoulembi
 Khuyol Haoba and Yaithing Konu
 Kadeng Thangjahanba and Tonu Laijinglembi
 Ura Naha Khongjomba and Pidonnu
 Wanglen Pungdingheiba and Sappa Chanu Silheibi

Bibliography
 Khamba Thoibi Seireng, by Hijam Anganghal Singh, 1986
 Moirang Kangleirol, Khuman Khamba Seitharon, by Laisram Mangi Singh, 1980
 Khamba Thoibi Seireng Ahumsuba Saruk, by Hijam Anganghal
 Full text of "Khamba Thoibi" and poems of Manipur
 Samukhonggi Bichar, by Hijam Anganghal Singh, 1997
 Hijam_Anganghal_Singh, by Elangbam Dinamani
 Abridged from T. C. Hodson's "The Meitheis", 1908

Notes

References 

Epic cycles of incarnations
History of Manipur
Indian literature
Meitei culture
Meitei folklore
Meitei literature